Stephen Sargolia is an Australian Paralympic amputee athletics competitor. At the 1984 New York Games, he won two silver medals in Men's 400 m A4 and Men's Long Jump A4.

References 

Paralympic athletes of Australia
Athletes (track and field) at the 1984 Summer Paralympics
Paralympic silver medalists for Australia
Sprinters with limb difference
Long jumpers with limb difference
Paralympic sprinters
Paralympic long jumpers
Australian amputees
Living people
Medalists at the 1984 Summer Paralympics
Year of birth missing (living people)
Paralympic medalists in athletics (track and field)
Australian male sprinters
Australian male long jumpers